Madhva Brahmins (also often referred as Madhvas or Sadh-Vaishnavas), are Hindu Brahmin communities in India, who follow Sadh Vaishnavism and Dvaita philosophy propounded by Madhvacharya. They are found mostly in the Indian states of Karnataka, Maharashtra, Goa, Tamil Nadu, Kerala, Telangana and Andhra Pradesh.

History
 
The Madhwa community traces its philosophical origins to Madhvacharya, the first said Sadh Vaishnava acharya, who lived around 13th century. The Ashta Mathas of Udupi were established by Madhvacharya by his disciples.
Other Acharyas who established mathas after Madhvacharya include Padmanabha Tirtha, Naraharitirtha, Akshobhya Tirtha, Jayatirtha, Sripadaraja, Vyasatirtha, Vadiraja Tirtha, Vijayendra Tirtha, Raghavendra Tirtha.
The affiliations of the Madhwa philosophy extended in the form of temples and monasteries from Udupi in the South India to Dwaraka in West India to Gaya in the East India to Badrinath in the North India.

The town of Udupi is famous for the Sri Krishna temple of 13th century. The Madhwas believe that the human soul is saved by the grace of God and God bestows on true devotees. Devotional worship is central to the lives of madhwas.

Demographics
Statewise list of Brahmin communities who have a section that follows the Dvaita Vedanta of Madhvacharya.

Karnataka  Deshasthas, Shivallis, Koteshwara Brahmins, Gaud Saraswats, Badaganadus, Karhades, Chitpavans, Aravathuvokkalu, Niyogi (Aravelu, Prathamasaki, Nandavarika), Nanda Vaidikas, Kannada Kamme, Uluchukamme.
Maharashtra & Madhya Pradesh  Deshasthas, Karhades, Gaud Saraswats, Chitpavans, Savase Brahmins and Chitrakoot Madhvas.
Tamil Nadu  Deshasthas (migrants from Karnataka and Maharashtra), Aruvaththuvakkalu (migrants from Karnataka), Badaganadus (migrants from Karnataka), Pennaththurar Brahmins, Niyogi Brahmins (Aruvela and Prathamasakis).
Andhra Pradesh & Telangana  Deshastha Madhvas and Telugu Madhvas (Telugu Brahmins who converted to Madhva faith).
Bihar  In Bihar, the whole Gayawal Brahmins are followers of Dvaita philosophy.
Goa  Gaud Saraswats - Bardez and Salcete regions are a stronghold of Madhwa Saraswats and are staunch devotees of Vishnu.
Kerala  In Kerala, the Embranthiris and the Gaud Saraswat Brahmins are followers Dvaita Vedanta of Madhvacharya. There is also a section among Nambudiri Brahmins who follow Madhvacharya.
Gujarat  In Gujarat there is a section among Gujarati Brahmins who follow Madhvacharya.

Society and culture

Language
Madhwa Brahmins are not a homogeneous community. Followers of Madhvacharya include Brahmins from multiple regions and are from various linguistic backgrounds. Madhwas who speak Kannada, one of the major languages of the mainly southern Dravidian languages group, speak a variety of Kannada that borders on a literary dialect. Even in the non-Kannada states Madhwas speak Kannada in their homes but with outsiders they speak the native language of that state. The Marathi, Kannada, Telugu and Tamil speaking Madhva Brahmins are all followers of Deshastha Mathas, which are spread in Maharashtra and throughout South India. The Tulu speaking Madhva Brahmins are followers of Tuluva Mathas. They are mainly concentrated in Tulunadu region of Karnataka, in the coastal districts of Udupi, Dakshina Kannada of present-day Karnataka state, and also in Kasargod and other parts of Kerala state. The Konkani speaking Madhva Brahmins are Gaud Saraswat Madhva Brahmins, who are spread throughout the Coastal Karnataka, Goa, Maharashtra and Kerala. The Bihari, Magahi and Hindi speaking Madhva Brahmins are Gayawal Brahmins, who are spread throughout the Gaya and Benares.

Occupations
The traditional occupation of Madhwa Brahmins is priesthood, but they also engaged in occupations such as agriculture and the business. At present, the majority of them work in government and private sectors.

The Tuluva Madhvas and Deshastha Madhvas are more sought after for priestly services by other communities. The Gaud Saraswat Madhvas are a religiously self-contained community. There are numerous cultural difference between these three subdivisions. In Bihar, Gayawal Brahmins are traditionally priests. They are the priests in the famous Vishnupad Temple, Gaya, who also hold a traditional monopoly over the performance of shraddha rituals on the Ghats of Gaya.

Diet

Madhwa Brahmins are pure vegetarian and their staple cereals are rice and wheat. Udupi cuisine is a synonymous name to Madhwa cuisine. It is a major vegetarian cuisine of Karnataka, which includes a combination of cereals, pulses, vegetables and spices.

Typical Madhwa cuisine consists of Saaru (Rasam), Huli (Sambar), Gojju and Anna (Rice). Gojju is generally a beloved dish to entire Madhwa community.
In sweets, Hayagreeva is a very common sweet dish made in most Madhwa Brahmin homes, made using Bengal gram with jaggery and coconut.

Strict Madhva Brahmins avoid onion, garlic, red lentils, and even carrots, radish, brinjal and a few other vegetables and spices. They usually only eat food (prasāda) that is offered (naivedya) to one of the Vishnu deities, and fast on Vaishnava Ekadashi days (twice a month) without taking any food or water. Fruits and milk are usually allowed on Ekadashi days.

Social and political issues
In 2017, the government of Karnataka introduced The Karnataka Prevention and Eradication of Inhuman Evil Practices and Black Magic Bill, 2017 in the assembly, which planned to ban all superstition practices considered black magic that promoted "social evils" and the persecution of skeptics. After much debate, Madhwa practices were exempted. In this practice, mudras usually made of gold or copper are heated in the yajna fire and stamped on the body.

Notable people
Vyasatirtha - a Dvaita saint and Rajaguru of Krishnadevaraya.
Vadiraja Tirtha - a Dvaita philosopher, Carnatic composer and mystic. He was pontiff of Sodhe mutt.
Kumara Vyasa (1419-1446) - an influential and classical, early 15th century poet in the Kannada language. His pen name is a tribute to his magnum opus, a rendering of the Mahabharata in Kannada.
 Purandara Dasa (1484–1564) - a Haridasa, who is widely referred to as the Pitamaha (lit, "father" or the "grandfather") of Carnatic Music.
 Pacchimiriam Adiyappa, an 18th-century famous court musician at the palace of Thanjavur Maratha kingdom.
 Mysore Vasudevacharya (1865-1961) a vocalist and composer of Carnatic Music who served as a court musician in the late Kingdom of Mysore.
 Dewan Purnaiah (1746-1812) - the Dewan of Mysore Kingdom under three rulers Hyder Ali, Tipu Sultan and Wadiyar. He is also founder of Yelandur estate
Satyadharma Tirtha (1743-1830) - a scholar, saint and mystic of Dvaita order of Vedanta; 28th pontiff of Uttaradi Matha.
Kanchi Krishnaswamy Rao (1845–1923) - Diwan of Travancore from 1898 to 1904.
Veene Sheshanna (1852-1926) - an exponent of the Veena, an Indian string instrument, which he played in the classical Carnatic music style. He was a concert musician at the court of the princely state of Mysore.
 P. N. Krishnamurti (1849–1911) - Dewan of Mysore state and 5th Jagirdar of Yelandur estate.
 Conjeevaram Hayavadana Rao (1865–1946) - an Indian historian, museologist, anthropologist, economist and polyglot. He was a member of the Royal Anthropological Institute, Indian Historical Records Commission and a fellow of the Royal Society of Economics.
Navaratna Rama Rao (1877–1960) - an Indian writer and scholar from Karnataka.
 Aluru Venkata Rao (1880–1964) - an Indian revolutionary, historian, writer and journalist.
 Palladam Sanjiva Rao (1882–1962) - an Indian flautist and carnatic musician.
Pralhad Balacharya Gajendragadkar (1901–1981) was the 7th Chief Justice of India, serving from February 1964 to March 1966. 
 V. K. R. Varadaraja Rao (1908–1991) - Indian economist, politician and educator.
 T. R. Ramachandran (1917–1990) - a Tamil actor and comedian who acted in lead and supportive roles from 1940s to the 1960s.
Kattingeri Krishna Hebbar (1911-1996) - a celebrated artist known for his India themed artworks; Winner of Padma Shri and Padma Bhushan awards.
Cheyur Krishna Nageshwaran (1933–2009) - an actor of Tamil, Telugu and Malayalam films and was mostly remembered for his roles as a comedian during the 1960s. In addition, he earned the sobriquet "Jerry Lewis of India."
Bhimsen Joshi (1922–2011) - an Indian singer from Karnataka in the Hindustani classical tradition and Bharat Ratna and Padma Shri awardee.
Shikaripura Ranganatha Rao (1922-2013) - an Indian archaeologist who led teams credited with the discovery of a number of Harappan sites including the port city Lothal and Bet Dwarka in Gujarat.
Vishnuvardhan (1950-2009) - an Indian film actor predominantly in Kannada cinema.
C. K. Prahalad (1941-2010) is an Indian-American entrepreneur and author. Internationally renowned "Management Guru" and one of the world's most influential business thinkers.
U. R. Ananthamurthy (1932-2014) - a contemporary writer and critic in the Kannada language;Winner of Jnanpith Award and Padma Bhushan.
Udupi Ramachandra Rao (1932-2017), Indian space scientist and chairman of the Indian Space Research Organisation. He pioneered the launch of India's first satellite Aryabhata in 1975.
Krishna Kumari (1933–2018) - a leading Telugu actress of the 1960s and 1980s.
Kashinath Hathwara (1951–2018) - an Indian actor and filmmaker who primarily worked in Kannada films.
Sakha Rama Rao - an Indian musician credited with having re-introduced the south Indian chitravina (or "gotuvadyam") to the concert scene.
Vishwesha Tirtha (1931-2019) was an Indian Hindu guru, saint and presiding swamiji of the Sri Pejavara Adokshaja Matha, one of the Ashta Mathas belonging to the Dvaita school of philosophy founded by Sri Madhvacharya.
Bannanje Govindacharya (1936-2020) was an Indian philosopher and Sanskrit scholar versed in Veda Bhashya, Upanishad Bhashya, Mahabharata, Puranas and Ramayana. Padma Shri Awardee (2009).
N. R. Narayana Murthy (born 21 August 1946) is the founder of Infosys, and has been the chairman, chief executive officer (CEO), president, and chief mentor of the company.
Sudha Murthy (born 19 August 1951) is an Indian educator, author and philanthropist who is chairperson of the Infosys Foundation. Murthy was awarded the Padma Shri, the fourth highest civilian award in India, for social work by the Government of India in 2006.
Shrinivas Kulkarni (born 4 October 1956) is a US-based astronomer born and raised in India. He is currently a professor of astronomy and planetary science at California Institute of Technology, and he served as director of Caltech Optical Observatory (COO) at California Institute of Technology, in which capacity he oversaw the Palomar and Keck among other telescopes. He is the recipient of a number of awards and honours.
Pralhad Joshi (born 27 November 1962) is an Indian politician who is the current Minister of Coal of India from the Bharatiya Janata Party.
Upendra (born 18 September 1969) is an Indian filmmaker, actor and politician known for his work in Kannada cinema.
Sunil Joshi (born 6 June 1970) is a former Indian cricketer and is currently one of the members of the national selection panel of the Board of Control for Cricket in India (BCCI).
Vijay Bharadwaj (born 15 August 1975) is a former Indian cricketer & cricket coach. He was a key architect of Karnataka's three Ranji Trophy triumphs in the 1990s.

See also

 Forward Castes
 Dvaita Vedanta
 Sadh Vaishnavism

Notes

References

Bibliography
 

Dvaita Vedanta
Brahmin communities
Brahmin communities of Karnataka
Brahmin communities of Maharashtra
Brahmin communities of Andhra Pradesh
Brahmin communities of Bihar